Borgaon, Wardha is a village in Wardha district in the state of Maharashtra, India. Gram panchayat of Borgaon village is Borgaon S. It  has a population of 869 peoples in a geographical area of 543.95 hectares.

References 

Villages in Wardha district